Loyalty and Betrayal is the sixth studio album by American rapper E-40, released October 10, 2000 on Jive and Sick Wid It Records. The album features production by Battlecat, Bosko, Jazze Pha, Rick Rock and Tone Capone. It peaked at number 4 on the Billboard Top R&B/Hip-Hop Albums chart and at number 18 on the Billboard 200. Two singles were released, "Behind Gates" and "Nah, Nah...", the latter peaked at number 61 on the Billboard Hot R&B/Hip-Hop Songs chart. The album features guest performances by fellow members of The Click: B-Legit, D-Shot and Suga-T, as well as Mack 10, Eightball, Too Short, Young Mugzi, Levitti, Pimp C and Birdman.

Along with a single, a music video was produced for the song "Behind Gates", featuring Ice Cube and a cameo appearance by WC. A second single, "Nah, Nah...", was also released as a music video, featuring Nate Dogg and cameo appearances by Ant Banks, JT the Bigga Figga, Mac Shawn and The Click.

Track listing

Charts

References

E-40 albums
2000 albums
Albums produced by Battlecat (producer)
Albums produced by Jazze Pha
Albums produced by Rick Rock
Albums produced by Bosko
Gangsta rap albums by American artists
Jive Records albums
Sick Wid It Records albums